The 1976–77 Hertha BSC season began against Karlsruher SC and finished 21 May 1977 against 1. FC Saarbrücken.

Review and events

Match results

Legend

Bundesliga

League table

DFB-Pokal

Squad

Squad and statistics

Source:

|}

Sources

Match reports

Other sources

Hertha BSC
Hertha BSC seasons